The Last Will Be the Last is a 2015 drama film written and directed  by Massimiliano Bruno and starring Paola Cortellesi and Alessandro Gassmann.

Plot 
In a city of Tuscia (Lazio), Luciana has a stable job in a weaving factory, and is in love with Stefano. Meanwhile, the shy policeman Antonio comes to the city, transferred from Verona after an unfortunate incident during his service. Luciana, because of her pregnancy, is fired from the factory, and she begins a very difficult period of financial straits. Antonio, meanwhile, suffers the harassment of his colleagues, and is absent-minded at work because of the remorse for the death of a friend of him during a military operation. Stefano, pressed by the difficult situation, has a relationship with a friend of Luciana. Luciana sinks ever deeper into despair, and decides to aim an attack at the office of the factory, against her former employer.

Cast 

 Paola Cortellesi as Luciana Colacci
 Alessandro Gassmann as  Stefano
 Fabrizio Bentivoglio as Antonio Zanzotto
 Ilaria Spada as  Simona
 Stefano Fresi as  Bruno
 Giorgio Caputo as  Enzo
 Irma Carolina Di Monte as Manuela

See also 
 List of Italian films of 2015

References

External links 

2015 films
Italian drama films
Films directed by Massimiliano Bruno
2015 drama films
2010s Italian films